Kiselyovsk is a town in Kemerovo Oblast, Russia, located in the foothill belt of the Salair Ridge, at the source of the Aba River,  south of Kemerovo. Population: 

The Kuzbass region, where Kiselyovsk is located, supplies 60% of Russia's coal, and the town suffers from heavy pollution due to the dominance of the coal mining and processing industries. The coal ash leads to a phenomenon known as "black snow". Another danger is spontaneous combustion of discarded coal.

Administrative and municipal status
Within the framework of administrative divisions, it is, together with five rural localities, incorporated as Kiselyovsk Town Under Oblast Jurisdiction—an administrative unit with the status equal to that of the districts. As a municipal divisions, Kiselyovsk Town Under Oblast Jurisdiction is incorporated as Kiselyovsky Urban Okrug.

History 
Residents of the town and Russian rights groups have campaigned for several years for the Russia government to move the city away from the immediate outskirts of the mine due to the extreme levels of pollution. In September 2019, a number of the town's residents lobbied the Canadian government to grant them status as environmental refugees.

Notable people
Vadim Bakatin (1937–2022), politician
Bohdan Bandura (born 1960), football midfielder
Sergey Dolmatov (born 1959), chess grandmaster
Aleksei Perminov (born 1968), footballer
Mikhail Shivlyakov (born 1980), strongman
Serhiy Tkach (1952–2018), serial killer

References

Notes

Sources

External links
Unofficial website of Kiselyovsk



Cities and towns in Kemerovo Oblast